Javlon Guseynov (born 24 June 1991) is an Uzbekistani professional footballer who plays as a centre-back for Indonesian club Persita Tangerang, on loan from Borneo Samarinda.

Career

Borneo
On 6 January 2019, Guseynov officially signed a year contract with Borneo. He extended the contract with Borneo on 5 January 2020.

Honours
AGMK
 Uzbekistan Cup: 2018

Individual
 Liga 1 Team of the season: 2019

References

External links
Javlon Guseynov at Soccerway

Living people
Sportspeople from Tashkent
Uzbekistani footballers
Uzbekistani expatriate footballers
1991 births
Uzbekistan Super League players
Javlon Guseynov
Liga 1 (Indonesia) players
FK Andijon players
FC AGMK players
Javlon Guseynov
FC Sogdiana Jizzakh players
Borneo F.C. players
Association football defenders
Expatriate footballers in Thailand
Expatriate footballers in Indonesia
Uzbekistani expatriate sportspeople in Thailand
Uzbekistani expatriate sportspeople in Indonesia